Hannah Georgas is the second studio album by Vancouver-based artist Hannah Georgas. Produced by Graham Walsh of the Canadian electronic band Holy Fuck, it was released by Dine Alone Records on October 2, 2012.

The album won "Pop Recording of the Year" at the Western Canadian Music Awards in 2013. It was nominated for Alternative Album of the Year at the 2013 Juno Awards, and was included on the 2013 Polaris Music Prize longlist.

The song "Millions" was featured in the closing of the Girls episode "Free Snacks" on February 9, 2014.

Track listing 

All songs written by Hannah Georgas except where noted

Personnel
Hannah Georgas - vocals, piano
Graham Walsh - minimoog, OP-1, drum programming, bass, guitar, six-track
Loel Campbell - drums
Joel Stouffer - drums
Tim D'Eon - guitar, piano
Dean Drouillard - guitar
Ryan Guldemond - vocals, synth, guitar
Shadrach Kabango - Vocals on "Waiting Game"
Charles F. - guitar

References

External links
Dine Alone Records Release Page

2012 albums
Hannah Georgas albums